The Thailand five-satang coin is a unit of currency equivalent to one-twentieth of a Thai baht. It was introduced in 1908 as a coin with a hole through its middle, which was minted until 1939. In 1946 the hole was removed and the new Thai monarch featured on the obverse: Rama IX. In 1996 a five-satang coin marked the 50th anniversary of his reign.

Mintages 
 1987 ~ 10,000
 1988 ~ 694,000
 1989 ~ 462,000
 1990 ~ 368,050
 1991 ~ 25,000
 1992 ~ 61,000
 1993 ~ 100,000
 1994 ~ 500,000
 1995 ~ 500,000
 1996 ~ 0
 1997 ~ 10,000
 1998 ~ 10,000
 1999 ~ 20,000
 2000 ~ 10,000
 2001 ~ 50,000
 2002 ~ 0
 2003 ~ 10,000
 2004 ~ 10,000
 2005 ~ 20,000
 2006 ~ 3,000
 2007 ~ 10,000
 2008 ~ 10,000
 2009 ~ 10,000

References 

Coins of Thailand
Five-cent coins